Forces of Nature is a 2016 book by Professor Brian Cox and Andrew Cohen. The book accompanied the BBC One TV series of the same name, Forces of Nature.

Overview

The book attempts to provide deep answers to simple questions, ranging from the nature of motion to the uniqueness of a snowflake. It uncovers how some of our planet's beautiful sights and events are forged by just a handful of natural forces.

References 

2016 non-fiction books
Popular physics books
HarperCollins books